Cute is a Maltese girl group consisting of Salaia Gerada, Trisha Smith, Paulanne Farrugia, Celaine Borg, and Marzia Farrugia.  The group participated for Malta in the Junior Eurovision Song Contest 2007, in Rotterdam, Netherlands with their song "Music".  They performed fourteenth in the contest, preceding Greece, and succeeding Sweden. They finished in 12th place scoring 37 points overall.

While in Rotterdam, the band sometimes wore matching outfits. They travelled to the contest with their manager Alison Ellul, sound engineer Elton Zarb and hairstylists Cut Coiffeur.

Band members
Cute comprises five teenage female vocalists, who have all attended the Annalise School of Dancing, in Malta; where they learnt choreography.  The group are also members of the Angelic Voices Choir.

 Salaia Gerada
 Trisha Smith
 Celaine Borg
 Marzia Farrugia
 Paulanne Farrugia

Between the 25 and 28 July 2006, band member Marzia Farrugia participated in the third edition of the Golden Cross International Singing Festival which is held annually in Malta. Marzia won the Best Choreography award with the song "Stejjer".

Junior Eurovision Song Contest

On 7 September 2007, Cute won the Maltese national final with a total of 82 points and represented Malta in the Junior Eurovision Song Contest 2007. The national final was held in the Sir Temi Zammit Hall of the University of Malta, Tal-Qroqq.

Discography

Singles
2007: "Hey You!"
2007: "Music"

See also 

 Malta in the Junior Eurovision Song Contest
 Junior Eurovision Song Contest 2007

References 

Junior Eurovision Song Contest entrants for Malta
Maltese pop singers